Kavuklu is a village in Bor district of Niğde Province, Turkey. The population of Karamahmutlu was 193 as of 2011.

References 

Villages in Bor District, Niğde